Shmavon Shmavonyan (born February 22, 1953, in the village of Verin Artashat, Ararat Province), is an Armenian artist.

Biography
Shmavon Shmavonyan was born in Verin Artashat, Armenia. He started painting at the age of 7. From 1971 to 1975 he studied painting at the Terlemezian School of Arts in Yerevan.

On May 20, 2003, Shmavonyan presented his painting "Eternity" to Glendale Memorial Hospital as a gift to the city of Glendale, California, in memory of loved ones lost on September 11, 2001. On March 18, 2008, in Mission Hills, California, Shmavonyan donated a painting to the Providence Holy Cross Medical Center followed by an art exhibition. In 2011 Shmavon Shmavonyan was presented by International Informatization Academy in general consultative status with economic and social council of the United Nations as an active member of Academy.

Exhibitions
Shmavon Shmavonyan had exhibitions in the following countries:
1982, Moscow
1984, St. Petersburg
1992, Istanbul
1995, France
1996, Beirut, England
1997, Kuwait
1998, Beirut
1999, US, Pasadena
2007, USA, California, participated the Art Expo 2007, New York City,
2013: Istanbul, "The Joy of Nature",
 2007, Exhibition of works at Bicycle Club Casino, California, USA.
 2013, October 1; Personal exhibition in Istanbul under the title of "The Joy of Nature". Sponsored by Osep Tokat in association with Consulate General of Greece in Istanbul and Paros Monthly Magazine.
 2015, January 22; Unveiling of Shmavon's painting "Bridge" at Providence Tarzana Hospital
 2017, February 24; Glendale, California. "Art Exhibit featuring Shmavon Shmavonian, Award-Winning International Artist at Komitas Cultural Committee Branch of Ark Family Center. 
 2017, March 10–12; Pasadena, California. An Extraordinary 3 day Art Exhibition by renowned artist Shmavon Shmavonyan at AGBU - Vatche & Tamar Manoukian Center

Awards
2007, Was granted with the gold medal of humanist, Nobel Peace Prize winner Fridtjof Nansen
2009, Awarded with gold medal of Ministry of culture of the Republic of Armenia
2011,  "Honorary Title of Meritorious Artist of the Republic of Armenia"
2012, June 5, Shmavonyan donated a valuable canvas "The Song of Songs" to Matenadaran, Mashtots Institute of Ancient Manuscripts, and was awarded with Mesrop Mashtots Medal 
 2015, painting "Bridge" received Certificate of Special Congressional Recognition from Brad Sherman - Member of Congress : Received Certificate of Recognition from Matt Dababneh -45th Assembly District : Received Certificate of Appreciation from Bob Blumenfield - Councilmember 3rd District : Received Commendation from Sheila Kuehl - Supervisor, Third District
 2016, Gold Medal on 2798 anniversary of Yerevan

Books and albums
Ararat (Armenian-English, Armenian-Russian), the works of Shmavonyan from 1993 to 2013 were presented in the album
Paruyr Sevak, My good dreams are for you, dears, author: Yuri Petrosyan. Book cover and inside paintings by Shmavon Shmavonyan, Yerevan, 2013

Gallery

See also
List of Armenian artists
Lists of Armenians

References

External links

Art and Paintings of Artist Shmavon Shmavonian
Shmavon Shmavonian, Paintings
Anthony Portantino (44th Assembly District) Welcomes Armenian Artist Shmavonian to State Capital Sacramento
Shmavon Paints at Descanso Gardens – Slideshow
Shmavon Paints Mrs. Books' Portrait 

1953 births
Armenian painters
Living people
People from Artashat, Armenia
Armenian expatriates in the United States